Chomętowo may refer to the following places:
Chomętowo, Kuyavian-Pomeranian Voivodeship (north-central Poland)
Chomętowo, Lubusz Voivodeship (west Poland)
Chomętowo, Masovian Voivodeship (east-central Poland)
Chomętowo, Choszczno County in West Pomeranian Voivodeship (north-west Poland)
Chomętowo, Gryfice County in West Pomeranian Voivodeship (north-west Poland)
Chomętowo, Świdwin County in West Pomeranian Voivodeship (north-west Poland)